Jeffrey is an unincorporated community located near Peter/s Creek on Bethlehem Church Road, approximately  northwest of
Tompkinsville, Monroe County, Kentucky, United States.

History

A post office was first established here, March 10, 1903, in the home of postmaster and namesake, Payton J. Jeffrey/s (1865-1926), and his wife, Ella (Arterburn) Jeffrey/s, which was later moved to their general store. Their daughter, Nola (Jeffrey/s) Simmons, was the last postmaster and one of the schoolteachers at the local rural school known as “Mud Slash” (1911-1967). Jeffrey's post office was discontinued March 31, 1937. Payton Jeffrey/s also operated a water-powered turbine grist mill located across from his store on Peter/s Creek, succeeded by his son-in-law, George Simmons.

Argil Black, Joe Bowman, William Joseph Burks, Finley Quinn, Leslie Samson, John Bedford Smith, and J. T. Turner were also merchants in this community. William T. Whitehead briefly operated a steam-powered sawmill on Kate Miller Branch of Peter/s Creek nearby.  The Ulysses Quinn Family later operated another water-powered turbine grist mill on Peter/s Creek located at the intersection of Stringtown-Flippin Road and Bethlehem Church Road nearby.

Jeffrey’s general stores and Mud Slash School and mills are gone. Fairview/Mud Slash Baptist Church (est. 1890) remains an active local congregation.

References

Unincorporated communities in Monroe County, Kentucky

External links